The Ferrari F40 (tipo F120) is a mid-engine, rear-wheel drive sports car engineered by Nicola Materazzi with styling by Pininfarina. It was built from 1987 until 1992, with the LM and GTE race car versions continuing production until 1994 and 1996 respectively. As the successor to the 288 GTO (also engineered by Materazzi), it was designed to celebrate Ferrari's 40th anniversary and was the last Ferrari automobile personally approved by Enzo Ferrari. At the time it was Ferrari's fastest, most powerful, and most expensive car for sale.

The car debuted with a planned production total of 400 units and a factory suggested retail price of approximately US$400,000 (fivefold the price of its predecessor, the 288 GTO) in 1987 ($ today). One of those that belonged to the Formula One driver Nigel Mansell was sold for the then record of £1 million in 1990, a record that stood into the 2010s. A total of 1,311 to 1,315 cars were manufactured with 213 units destined for the United States.

Development

Origin 
As early as 1984, Materazzi had proposed to Enzo Ferrari the idea of using the Group B 4-litre category (2.857-litre if turbocharged) to prove the performance of new road cars which with increased power could no longer safely display their performance on the road in the hands of regular buyers. Since Enzo Ferrari no longer had control over the production part of the business, Materazzi had to obtain permission from General Manager Eugenio Alzati. Permission was granted but only at the condition that work would take place outside of the Monday to Friday work week. A very small team thus developed the GTO Evoluzione on Saturdays to compete in the same class entered by the Porsche 959 in FIA Group B.

However, when the FIA brought an end to the Group B category for the 1986 season, Enzo Ferrari was left with five 288 GTO Evoluzione development cars, and no series to enter them into the competition. These were left for enthusiasts who might consider purchasing one until a validation driver convinced Enzo Ferrari that Materazzi could keep the base car concept alive and make it roadworthy. Enzo's desire to leave a legacy in his final sports car allowed the Evoluzione program to be further developed to produce a car exclusively for road use. In particular, Ferrari had been impressed with the development of recent cars which claimed back much of the performance deficit inflicted by ever more restrictive emissions regulations.

In response to the quite simple, but very expensive car with relatively little out of the ordinary being called a "cynical money-making exercise" aimed at speculators, a figure from the Ferrari marketing department was quoted as saying "We wanted it to be very fast, sporting in the extreme and Spartan," "Customers had been saying our cars were becoming too plush and comfortable." "The F40 is for the most enthusiastic of our owners who want nothing but sheer performance. It isn't a laboratory for the future, as the 959 is. It is not Star Wars. And it wasn't created because Porsche built the 959. It would have happened anyway." In fact the reasons for the car's rawness and simplicity are very much linked to Materazzi's racing background (starting from the Stratos Gr.4, the Gr.5 Silhouette, then the Osella F2 and F1 cars, the 126C and eventually the 288 GTO).

The body of the F40 was designed by Pietro Camardella under the supervision of, soon to retire, Aldo Brovarone of studio Pininfarina. Nicola Materazzi meanwhile worked on evolutions of the engine, gearbox and other mechanical parts of the car to make them roadworthy. Many of these were well validated in the 288 GTO Evoluzione, from which the F40 takes many styling cues. From the beginning of the project on 10 June 1986, Enzo Ferrari asked for the car to be completed in a very short space of time (11 months) and be presented in the summer of 1987. For this reason, he gave Materazzi permission to choose all the engineers on the team. Some of the development of the car, such as the bodywork was carried out at external companies like Michelotto Automobili (in Padua) which had experience in rally and race preparation (Stratos, GTO Evo, subsequently 333SP, 348, 355, 360, 430, 458).

Power, torque, and suspension 
Gearing, torque curves, and actual power output differed among the cars. The F40 did without a catalytic converter until 1990, when US regulations made them a requirement for emissions control reasons. The flanking exhaust pipes guide exhaust gases from each bank of cylinders while the central pipe guides gases released from the wastegate of the turbochargers. The F40's twin-turbocharged V8 would be Ferrari's final forced induction engine until the California T in 2014.

The suspension setup was similar to the GTO's double wishbone setup, though many parts were upgraded and settings were changed; the unusually low ground clearance prompted Ferrari to include the ability to raise the vehicle's ground clearance when necessary for later cars via hydraulic lift chambers in the front dampers.

Body and interior 

The body was an entirely new design by Pininfarina featuring panels made of Kevlar, carbon fibre, and aluminium for strength and low weight, and intense aerodynamic testing employed. Weight was further minimised through the use of a polycarbonate plastic windshield and windows. The cars did have moderate air conditioning but had no sound system, door handles, glove box, leather trim, carpets, or door panels. The first 50 cars produced had sliding Lexan windows, while later cars were fitted with wind-down windows.

All cars technically left the factory in "Rosso Corsa" colour and left-hand drive. At least seven cars were modified and delivered to the Sultan of Brunei in right-hand drive. The Sultan employed Pininfarina's prototype manager Paolo Garella to make modifications to the cars (colour, power, interior comforts).

Aerodynamics 
Cooling was important as the forced induction engine generated a great deal of heat. As a consequence, the car was somewhat like an open-wheel racing car with a body. It had a partial undertray to smooth airflow beneath the radiator, front section, and the cabin, and a second one with diffusers behind the engine, but the engine bay was not sealed.

Tyres 
Owing to the fact that the car had an additional 80 bhp compared to the 288 GTO, a new tyre had to be developed to cope with the power levels which were more typically associated with racing cars. Materazzi leaned on his good experience with the Pirelli head of development Mario Mezzanotte, who he had known since the rallying years with the Lancia cars. Pirelli made a carcass with light materials (including Kevlar) after the experience gained in the Formula 1 seasons from 1980 to 1985 and asymmetrical tread patterns to create the P-Zero specifically for the F40.

Launch and promotion 
The F40 was revealed on 21 July 1987 at the Civic Centre in Maranello. Originally the presentation was due to happen at the Frankfurt motorshow according to Materazzi but FIAT needed to present the Alfa Romeo 164 at that show and the two would have clashed. Hence on insistence of Enzo Ferrari the launch was anticipated by more than two months. Counting from the project incipit (June 1986) until the launch, the car was developed in 13 months.

The promotion of the car was captured by the cameras in a documentary that included footage of Enzo Ferrari's past interviews, work inside the factory and the F40 driving through the streets of Modena. F1 driver Michele Alboreto drove the car on several occasions including a Christmas 1987 special programme for the Italian TV and journalist Ezio Zermiani when the car was filmed driving from Maranello to Milan.

Racing

LM

The racing cars were prepared by Michelotto (based in Padua) the Ferrari specialist who had already carried out work on the GTO Evoluzione and on parts of the road-going version of the F40.

3 chassis were prepared and 2 were used in races, with serial numbers 79890 and 79891. The third chassis, with serial number 88521, was intended to be raced and was a spare car that stayed at Michelotto but was never raced.

The car saw competition as early as 1989 when it debuted in the Laguna Seca Raceway round of the IMSA, appearing in the GTO category, with an LM evolution model driven by Jean Alesi, finishing third to the two faster spaceframe four wheel drive Audi 90s and beating a host of other factory-backed spaceframe specials that dominated the races. In the following race, it had to retire after 18 laps.
The next IMSA season, driven by a host of guest drivers such as Jean-Pierre Jabouille, Jacques Laffite and Hurley Haywood, three second-places and one third-place were the best results.

Although the F40 would not return to IMSA in 1991, it would later be a popular choice by privateers to compete in numerous domestic GT series including JGTC.

In 1994, the car made its debut in international competitions, with one car campaigned in the BPR Global GT Series by Strandell, winning at the 4 Hours of Vallelunga.

In 1995, the number of F40s climbed to four, developed independently by Pilot-Aldix Racing (F40 LM) and Strandell (F40 GTE, racing under the Ferrari Club Italia banner), winning the 4 Hours of Anderstorp. No longer competitive against the newly entered McLaren F1 GTR, the Ferrari F40 returned for another year in 1996, managing to repeat the previous year's Anderstorp win, and from then on it was no longer seen in GT racing. In total 19 cars were produced.

Competizione 

The F40 Competizione is a non-sponsored, more powerful version of the F40 LM, which was the result of consumer requests following the order of a French importer who wanted to enter one in the 24 Hours of Le Mans. 10 examples were built, all at customer request, the first two being called F40 LM's, and the remaining 8 being F40 Competizione, as Ferrari felt that the LM tag was too restrictive.

Chassis number 80782 was originally purchased as a road car and imported into the Netherlands in 1989 by the official Ferrari importer, Kroymans BV. Work was then done by Peter van Erp of Cavallino Tuning, Kroymans' racing division to convert it into "Competizione" specification, with new shock absorbers, new instrumentation, brakes, bodywork, and a new paint job. The car was consistently promoted through the Ferrari Challenge, and modifications in 1995 were made to maintain the car's competitiveness. After the car was sold to its most recent owner, it had a decorative makeover which consisted of a repaint in Grigio Nardo and blue fabric seats.

Performance 
The first independent measurements yielded 0- in 4.7 seconds and a top speed of  onto the French Sport Auto September 1988 cover.

The next opportunity to reach the claimed top speed was a shootout at Nardò Ring organized by Auto, Motor und Sport. Both were limited production cars with only 29 built, so while the F40 never was the world's fastest sports car as self-appraised by Ferrari, it could still claim the title of the fastest production car with over 500 units built until the arrival of the Lamborghini Diablo (depending on how the term "production car" is defined).

Test results by Car and Driver:
 0–: 1.8 seconds
 0–: 2.5 seconds
 0–: 3.6 seconds
 0–: 4.2 seconds
 0–: 4.9 seconds
 0–: 5.7 seconds
 0–: 7.2 seconds
 0–: 8.3 seconds
 0–: 9.5 seconds
 0–: 11.0 seconds
 0–: 13.5 seconds
 0–: 15.6 seconds
 0–: 18.0 seconds
 0–: 21.3 seconds
 0–: 26.3 seconds
 -: 12.1 seconds, using 5th gear (~1,968 rpm at 50 mph)
 -: 12.2 seconds, using 5th gear
 Standing  mile (402 m): 12.1 seconds at 
 Braking 70–0 mph: 218 ft (113–0 km/h: 66 m)
 Observed fuel economy: 
 Top speed: 

Test results by AMS:
 0-: 3.8 seconds
 0-: 4.6 seconds
 0-: 5.6 seconds
 0-: 8.1 seconds
 0-: 9.3 seconds
 0-: 11.0 seconds
  Top speed:

Reception 

When the F40 was unveiled in 1987 it received mixed reactions. Dennis Simanaitis praised its looks in Road & Track, but others were unimpressed. Observers considered it as a cynical attempt to cash in on speculators money after seeing how much was paid for used 288 GTOs and for the Porsche 959. Speculators were expecting Enzo Ferrari's death and to benefit from raising prices. It was estimated in 1990 that only 10% of the delivered F40s were used for driving.

People could watch speculators selling the cars to each other at public auctions with ever-rising prices up to over 7 times the list price in 1989 (before the bubble burst) which made it even more desirable. Playing a main role in contemporary video games like F40 Pursuit Simulator (Crazy Cars II), Turbo Outrun, The Duel: Test Drive II, Miami Chase, Formula One: Built to Win and Out Run Europa also increased its fame. It appeared on many magazine covers and children's bedroom wall posters.

Autocar tested an F40 in 1988 at the Fiorano test circuit. The writer, Mel Nichols, stated: "I do not yet know how whether the F40 is tractable in traffic, fearsome on the wet, harsh on bumpy roads or too noisy on long journeys. It has no luggage space and getting in and out is awkward. But I do know this: on a smooth road it is a scintillatingly fast car that is docile and charming in its nature; a car that is demanding but not difficult to drive, blessed as it is with massive grip and, even more importantly, superb balance and manners. You can use its performance, the closest any production car maker has yet come to race car levels, and revel in it."

In 1988, Ferrari invited journalists to test the F40 at their home track Fiorano Circuit and bring a Porsche 959 along for comparison.
The Automobile Magazine and Car magazines made an overall verdict, for both of them, the Porsche 959 was the better car.

Gordon Murray analyzed the car in Motor Trend 07/1990: "It's the lack of weight that makes the Ferrari so exciting. There's nothing else magic about the car at all...They're asking two- and three-inch-diameter steel tubes at chassis base datum level to do all the work, and it shows – you can feel the chassis flexing on the circuit and it wobbles all over the place on the road. It really does shake about. And, of course, once you excite the chassis the door panels start rattling and squeaking. Whereas the other cars feel taut and solid, this one's like a big go-kart with a plastic body on it." He severely criticized the old racing technology: "It's not even '60s technology, from a frame point of view, it's '50s twin-tube technology, not even a spaceframe. It's only got local frames to hold the bulkhead to the dash, attach the front suspension, rear suspension and roll bar. And then you have the marketing Kevlar glues in with a quarter-inch of rubber."

Car and Driver called the car a "mix of sheer terror and raw excitement". The rear vision was so bad that lane changes required "leaps of faith".
It was found unfit for daily road use, "clunky and cantankerous" around town, "so mechanically delinquent that an onboard mechanic is advised", to describe driver discomfort "Bangkok debtors' prison" was used. In a comparison test the Lamborghini Diablo was found better looking by the civilians while the testers opted for the F40. When Car and Driver declared the Porsche 911 Turbo the quickest A-to-B four-wheeled transport on American highways, the "nervous" Ferrari F40 wasn't found competitive because of being a 30-minute car. "After that, you'd like a cool drink and a brief nap."

Legacy 
Despite the mixed reviews on the car due to its spartan design and lack of the latest technology (when compared to the Porsche 959 and other supercars), the F40 remains a car that is liked by many individuals in the press and owners. Evo magazine's 2013 "Ferrari F40 buying guide" started with "For many it's the greatest road-going Ferrari of all". An expert explained its popularity among the Ferrari cognoscenti: "They will never be allowed to make another F40 in today's world of red tape and health and safety. That is what makes it so special and so desirable."

Richard Hammond compared the F40 to the Porsche 959 stating the F40 to be "as visceral and edgy an experience as the 959 is refined and sophisticated."

The value and the appeal of supercars are very subjective. Autocar named it the ultimate car to drive. Pistonheads stated that "There have been prettier, quicker, rarer Ferraris than the one built in its 40th year. But none as special". Motor Sport Magazine re-appraised it for the 21 century noting that its engine power delivery is docile at modest speeds and is unleashed when demanded by the driver. Classic And Sportscar concluded after a test with XJ220, EB110 and F40: "It's far from perfect. Actually, perfect isn't even on its radar but it's brutal, ballistic and a bit scary. Magic. No it really is that good." Autoexpress also noted that when the cars have the correct servicing of mechanical components and of the rubberised fuel tanks they are to this day robust and reliable thanks to their simplicity.

Ferrari chief test-driver Dario Benuzzi feels that despite the 1970s and 80s technology, the car is very relevant and interesting to passionate drivers: “It was a lightweight car with a lot of power and that's what makes it fun to drive. Of course, the handling was also very good. So, all in all, a very good package! I think that, if we'd been able to adopt a steering and brake servo, the F40 would still be a force to be reckoned with among supercars today.”

Full official specifications 
Ferrari published the following specifications relating to the F40 flagship model.

Performance 
Top speed: 
Acceleration:
0–: 4.1 seconds.
0–400 m: 11.9 seconds.
0–1000 m: 20.9 seconds.
Track Tests
Bedford Autodrome: 1:25.50
Tsukuba: 1:03.73
Suzuka: 2:25.265

Engine specifications

Type: rear-mid longitudinal 90° V8 engine
Bore x Stroke: ;
Unitary displacement: 
Total displacement: 
Compression ratio: 7.7:1
Maximum power:  at 7,000 rpm
Specific output:  /litre
Maximum torque:  at 4,000 rpm
Valve actuation: DOHC per bank, 4 valves per cylinder
Fuel feed: Weber-Marelli electronic fuel injection and single spark plug ignition per cylinder
Aspiration: IHI twin-turbos and intercoolers
Lubrication system: dry sump
Clutch: twin-plate

Bodywork 
Type: two-seater berlinetta
Length: 4358 mm (171.57 inches)
Width: 1970 mm (77.56 inches)
Height: 1123 mm (44.21 inches)
Wheelbase: 2450 mm (96.46 inches)
Front track: 1594 mm (62.76 inches)
Rear track: 1606 mm (63.23 inches)
Weight: 1100 kg (dry) (2425 pounds)

Chassis 
Frame: tubular steel and composites
Front suspension: independent, unequal-length wishbones, coil springs over telescopic shock absorbers, anti-roll bar
Rear suspension: independent, unequal-length wishbones, coil springs over telescopic shock absorbers, anti-roll bar
Brakes: 330 mm discs with Brembo calipers at the front and rear.
Transmission: 5-speed manual transmission + reverse gear
Steering: rack and pinion
Fuel tank: capacity 120 litres (31.7006 US gallons), (24.6 UK gallons)
Front tyres: 235/45 ZR 17 or 245/40 ZR 17
Rear tyres: 335/35 ZR 17

Fuel consumption 
 EPA premium gasoline, 2.9L, 8 cyl, Manual 5-spd 1990–1992
 Combined 
 City 
 Highway

References

Bibliography 
 

Flagship vehicles
Coupés
F40
Sports cars
Rear mid-engine, rear-wheel-drive vehicles
Cars introduced in 1987
Pininfarina
24 Hours of Le Mans race cars
1990s cars
Cars discontinued in 1992